The earliest record of a Sumerian creation myth, called The Eridu Genesis by historian Thorkild Jacobsen, is found on a single fragmentary tablet excavated in Nippur by the Expedition of the University of Pennsylvania in 1893, and first recognized by Arno Poebel in 1912. It is written in the Sumerian language and dated to around 1600 BCE. Other Sumerian creation myths from around this date are called the Barton Cylinder, the Debate between sheep and grain and the Debate between Winter and Summer, also found at Nippur.

Summary 
The beginning of the tablet is lost, but the surviving portion begins by recounting how the gods An, Enlil, Enki, and Ninhursanga created the Sumerians and comfortable conditions for the animals to live and procreate. Kingship then descends from heaven, and the first cities are founded: Eridu, Bad-tibira, Larak, Sippar, and Shuruppak.

After a missing section, we learn that the gods have decided not to save mankind from an impending flood. Zi-ud-sura, the king and gudug priest, learns of this. In the later Akkadian version recorded in the Atra-Hasis Epic, Ea (Sumerian Enki), the god of the waters, warns the hero (Akkadian Atrahasis) and gives him instructions for building an ark. This is missing in the Sumerian fragment, but a mention of Enki taking counsel with himself suggests similar instructions in the Sumerian version.

Flood myth 
Before the missing section, the gods have decided to send a flood to destroy mankind. Enki, god of the underworld sea of fresh water and equivalent of Babylonian Ea, warns Ziusudra, the ruler of Shuruppak, to build a large boat, though the directions for the boat are also lost.

When the tablet resumes, it describes the flood. A terrible storm rages for seven days and nights. "The huge boat had been tossed about on the great waters." Then Utu (Sun) appears and Ziusudra opens a window, prostrates himself, and sacrifices an ox and a sheep.

After another break, the text resumes with the flood apparently over, and Ziusudra prostrating himself before An (Sky) and Enlil (Lordbreath), who give him "breath eternal" for "preserving the animals and the seed of mankind". The remainder is lost.

The Epic of Ziusudra adds an element at lines 258–261 not found in other versions, that after the river flood "king Ziusudra ... they caused to dwell in the land of the country of Dilmun, the place where the sun rises". In this version of the story, Ziusudra's boat floats down the Euphrates river into the Persian Gulf (rather than up onto a mountain, or up-stream to Kish). The Sumerian word KUR in line 140 of the Gilgamesh flood myth was interpreted to mean "mountain" in Akkadian, although in Sumerian, KUR means "mountain" but also "land", especially a foreign country, as well as "the Underworld".

Some modern scholars believe the Sumerian deluge story corresponds to localized river flooding at Shuruppak (modern Tell Fara, Iraq) and various other cities as far north as Kish, as revealed by a layer of riverine sediments, radiocarbon dated to c. 2900 BCE, which interrupt the continuity of settlement. Polychrome pottery from the Jemdet Nasr period (c. 3000–2900 BCE) was discovered immediately below this Shuruppak flood stratum. None of the predynastic antediluvian rulers have been verified as historical by archaeological excavations, epigraphical inscriptions or otherwise, but the Sumerians purported them to have lived in the mythical era before the great deluge.

A Sumerian document known as the Instructions of Shuruppak, dated by Kramer to about 2600 BCE, refers in a later version to Ziusudra. Kramer stated Ziusudra had become a "venerable figure in literary tradition" by the 3rd millennium BCE. Yi Samuel Chen argues that the earliest references to Ziusudra can be dated to the Old Babylonian Period.

Parallels 

Other flood myths with many similarities to the Sumerian story are the story of the Dravida king Manu in the Matsya Purana, the Utnapishtim episode in the Epic of Gilgamesh and the Genesis flood narrative in the Bible. The ancient Greeks and Romans had two similar myths from a later date: the Deucalion story and Zeus' world flood in Book I of Ovid's Metamorphoses. The Germanic and Norse story of Ymir also has parallels to the flood myth.

Ziusudra and Xisuthros 

Zi-ud-sura is known to us from the following sources:
 From the Sumerian Flood myth discussed above.
 In reference to his immortality in some versions of The Death of Gilgamesh
 Again in reference to his immortality in The Poem of Early Rulers
 As Xisuthros in Berossus' Hellenistic account of Babylonian history
 As Ziusudra in the WB-62 recension of the Sumerian king list. This text diverges from all other extant king lists by listing the city of Shuruppak as a king, and including Ziusudra as "Shuruppak's" successor.
 A later version of a document known as The Instructions of Shuruppak refers to Ziusudra.

In both of the late-dated king lists cited above, the name Zi-ud-sura was inserted immediately before a flood event included in some versions of the Sumerian king list. However, no other king list mentions Zi-ud-sura.

See also

 Atra-Hasis
 Creation myth
 Deluge (mythology)
 Enūma Eliš
 Epic of Gilgamesh
 Gilgamesh flood myth
 Mesopotamian mythology
 Song of the hoe
 Sumerian literature

Notes

External links
 ETCSL – Text and translation of the Eridu Genesis (alternate site) (The Electronic Text Corpus of Sumerian Literature, Oxford)
 Translation and adaptation of Eridu Genesis (Livius.org)

16th-century BC literature
Archaeological discoveries in Iraq

Sumerian literature
Creation myths
Flood myths
Clay tablets
Shuruppak